Coleophora hieronella is a moth of the family Coleophoridae. It is found in southern Europe and North Africa.

The length of the forewings is 6-6.5 mm for males and 5.5–6 mm for females.

The larvae feed on Trifolium angustifolium.

References

hieronella
Moths described in 1849
Moths of Europe
Moths of Africa